Max Weber (1864–1920) was a German political economist and sociologist.

Max Weber may also refer to:

Max Weber Sr. (1836–1897), German politician and father of Max Weber (1864–1920)
Max Weber (Swiss politician) (1897–1974), Swiss politician, member of the Swiss Federal Council (1951–1954)
Max Weber (general) (1824–1901), German revolutionary and Brigadier General of the Union army during the American Civil War
Max Carl Wilhelm Weber (1852–1937), Dutch zoologist and museum director at the University of Amsterdam
Max Weber (artist) (1881–1961), American cubist painter
Max Weber (racewalker) (1922–2007), German athlete
Max Maria von Weber (1822–1881), German civil engineer